This article shows the 2019 season of South Korean football.

National team results

Senior team

Under-23 team

K League

K League 1

K League 2

Promotion-relegation playoffs
The promotion-relegation playoffs were held between the winners of the 2019 K League 2 playoffs and the 11th-placed club of the 2019 K League 1.

Busan IPark won 2–0 on aggregate and were promoted to the K League Classic, while Gyeongnam FC were relegated to the K League Challenge.

Korean FA Cup

Korea National League

WK League

Table

Playoff and championship

AFC Champions League

See also
Football in South Korea

References

External links

Seasons in South Korean football